Rosa Venus is a Rock en español album recorded by Mexican rock band Fobia. The album was released on July 26, 2005. Songs include "Hoy tengo miedo", previously recorded their previous album Wow 87*04, No eres yo, and 200 Sabados. This is Fobia's first full-length album since Amor Chiquito of 1995.

Track listing
 "Rosa Venus (Venus Rose)
 "No Eres Yo" (You are Not Me)
 "200 sábados" (200 Saturdays)
 "No soy un buen perdedor" (I Am Not a Good Loser)
 "12 Pasos" (12 Steps)
 "1 Camino y un Camión" (1 road and one truck)
 "2 corazones" (2 hearts)
 "Todas las estrellas" (All the Stars)
 "Una vida sencilla" (An Easy Life)
 "Muy Maniaco de mi Parte" (So Maniacal of Me)
 "Sembrando Estrellas" (Sowing stars)
 "Hoy Tengo Miedo" (bonus track)  (Today I'm afraid)

2006 albums
Fobia albums